Platypodium is a genus of flowering plants in the legume family, Fabaceae. It belongs to the subfamily Faboideae, and has been assigned to the informal monophyletic Pterocarpus clade within the Dalbergieae.

References

Dalbergieae
Fabaceae genera